The 2000 Estoril Open was a tennis tournament played on outdoor clay courts. This event was the 11th edition of the Estoril Open for the men (the 4th for the women), included in the 2000 ATP Tour International Series and in the 2000 WTA Tour Tier IV Series. Both the men's and the women's events took place at the Estoril Court Central, in Oeiras, Portugal, from 10 April through 17 April 2000. Carlos Moyà and Anke Huber won the singles titles.

Finals

Men's singles

 Carlos Moyà defeated  Francisco Clavet, 6–3, 6–2

Women's singles

 Anke Huber defeated  Nathalie Dechy, 6–2, 1–6, 7–5

Men's doubles

 Donald Johnson /  Piet Norval defeated  David Adams /  Joshua Eagle, 6–4, 7–5

Women's doubles

 Tina Križan /  Katarina Srebotnik defeated  Amanda Hopmans /  Cristina Torrens Valero, 6–0, 7–6(11–9)

External links
Official website

2000
Estoril
Estoril
Estoril Open
 Estoril Open